Battle of Konduga may refer to:

Battle of Konduga (2014)
Battle of Konduga (2015)